Leo Halpin Mahony, AIA, (November 5, 1931 - June 18, 2010), was an American architect who practiced in the mid to late-twentieth-century Connecticut, New York, New Jersey, and Pennsylvania, under his own name as Leo H. Mahony (fl. 1962–1967) and partner in the architectural firm name of Mahony & Zvosec, Architects & Planners, of Princeton, New Jersey from 1967.

Personal life
Born in November 5, 1931 in Baldwin, New York, he earned his Bachelor of Architecture from the Pratt Institute in 1958. In 1970, he lived on Woodsville Road, Hopewell, New Jersey 08525. He was the president of Jaycees, South Brunswick Township from 1962 - 1963. Chairman of the Zoning Board Adjustment, South Brunswick Township from 1964 - 1965. He served in the United States Air Force as a Staff Sergeant from 1949 - 1952.  He died on June 18, 2010.

Architectural career
Mahony joined the New Jersey Society of Architects, American Institute of Architects, in 1963, and was registered to practice in Connecticut, New York, New Jersey, and Pennsylvania. He practiced under his own name, Leo H. Mahony, from 1962 to 1967.  With John M. Zvosec, he established Mahony & Zvosec in 1967. The firm practiced out of the Gallup Robinson Building, Research Park, Princeton, New Jersey 08540.

Works as Leo H. Mahony
1965: Our Lady of Mercy Church (South Bound Brook, New Jersey)
1966: Our Lady Of Calvary Retreat House (Farmington, Connecticut)

Works as Mahony & Zvosec
1969: South Brunswick Township Public Library (South Brunswick, New Jersey)
1969: St. Anthony's Church & School (Highstown, New Jersey)
1969: St. Luke's Church & Rectory (North Plainfield, New Jersey)

References

1931 births
Defunct architecture firms based in New Jersey
Architecture firms based in New Jersey
Architects from New Jersey
Architects from New York (state)
People from Baldwin, Nassau County, New York
People from Hopewell, New Jersey
Pratt Institute alumni
American ecclesiastical architects
Architects of Roman Catholic churches
Living people